The 2006–07 Euro Hockey Tour was the 11th season of the Euro Hockey Tour. The season consisted of four tournaments, the Česká Pojišťovna Cup, Karjala Tournament, Channel One Cup, and the LG Hockey Games. The top two teams met in the final, and the third and fourth place teams met for the third place game.

Tournaments

Česká Pojišťovna Cup
Russia won the Česká Pojišťovna Cup.

Karjala Tournament
Russia won the Karjala Tournament.

Channel One Cup
Russia won the Channel One Cup.

LG Hockey Games
Sweden won the Sweden Hockey Games.

Final standings

Final tournament

References
Season on hockeyarchives.info

 
2006–07 in European ice hockey
Euro Hockey Tour